Sister Spit was a lesbian-feminist spoken-word and performance art collective based in San Francisco, signed to Mr. Lady Records.  They formed in 1994 and disbanded in 2006.  Founding members included Michelle Tea and Sini Anderson,  Other members included Jane LeCroy and poet Eileen Myles.  The group were noted for their Ramblin' Roadshow, performing at feminist events such as the Michigan Womyn's Music Festival.  The Boston Phoenix described it as "the coolest (and cutest) line-up of talented, tattooed, pierced, and purple-pigtailed performance artists the Bay Area has to offer."

The Independent Weekly magazine described the group as a "literary celebration of outspoken and courageous feminists".  Sister Spit performed on numerous occasions at the Michigan Womyn's Music Festival, as well as on multiple tours across the United States, chiefly to LGBT audiences, including the Castro Street Fair, Pride and Ladyfest in San Francisco.  They played at such locations as Boston, Cambridge, Massachusetts and Buffalo, New York.

Michelle Tea revived the tour in April 2007, calling the new incarnation Sister Spit: The Next Generation. The new group includes original Sister Spitters Eileen Myles and Ali Liebegott, as well as younger writers such as Cristy Road, Nicole Georges, and Rhiannon Argo.

For a month on the road, Sister Spit: The Next Generation traveled across the U.S. and Canada, and occasionally through Europe, performing mainly at universities and art centers. In order to reflect changes in gender identity and sexual orientation, the line-up no longer includes only women. Performers have included Nicole Georges, Cristy Road, Eileen Myles, Beth Lisick, Blake Nelson, Justin Vivian Bond and Ariel Schrag.

In 2017, the 20th Anniversary Sister Spit tour included Denise Benavides, Virgie Tovar, Maya Songbird, Celeste Chan, Cathy de la Cruz, Juliana Delgado Lopera and Joshua Jennifer Espinoza.

Sister Spit and City Lights Publishers

In 2012 Sister Spit made the long-desired leap from promoting and supporting up-and-coming queer, feminist writers to actually shepherding them into print via a collaboration with City Lights Publishers. The new imprint, City Lights/Sister Spit, began by publishing the anthology Sister Spit: Writing, Rants and Reminiscence from the Road. Subsequently, it has published works by Ali Liebegott, Beth Lisick, and others. In their 40th-anniversary issue, Ms. magazine named the anthology a "great read" of the season that honors the cultural institution that is the Sister Spit roadshow.

The mission of the City Lights/Sister Spit imprint is to publish primarily but not exclusively writings that are informed by a queer, feminist outsider perspectives. Editor Michelle Tea wishes to nurture work from people who struggle to find a place.

Membership
Sister Spit had a rotating membership.  Members for many or all shows included

Michelle Tea - writer; co-founder and co-host of Sister Spit
Sini Anderson - performance poet, producer, and director; co-founder and co-host of Sister Spit
Ida Acton - author
Kirk Read - writer and performer
Marci Blackman - novelist, Stonewall Book Award winner
Cooper Lee Bombardier- writer and visual artist
Lynnee Breedlove - lead singer of Tribe 8 and writer
Tara Jepsen - performance artist, actor, and writer
Rocco Kayiatos - poet and beatboxer
Beth Lisick - writer, filmmaker and musician
Shar Rednour- author, filmmaker, podcast host
Miranda Mellis - dancer, trapeze artist, and poet
Eileen Myles - author 
Sara Seinberg - photographer
Anna Joy Springer - professor at UCSD
Samuael Topiary - filmmaker, performer, PhD candidate at UCSC
Ali Liebegott - author
Amos Mac - photographer
MariNaomi - cartoonist
Myriam Gurba - author
Blake Nelson - author
Nicole J. Georges - cartoonist
Sash Sunday - heckler/roadie
Kat Yoas - author

Releases
I Spit On Your Country: Words From The '97 Roadshow, Mouth Almighty Records, 1998
Sister Spit's Ramblin' Road Show - Greatest Spits, Mr. Lady Records, May 29, 2001. 
Tribe Spit Deep, 2002

Bibliography
Tea, Michelle. Sister Spit: Writing, Rants and Reminiscence from the Road (City Lights, 2012). 
Felix, Dia. Nochita (City Lights, 2014). 
Moïse, Lenelle. Haiti Glass (City Lights, 2014).

References

External links
Sister Spit website
"Sister Spit: Who's in the Van" - selected members of the original group touring with new members
Michelle Tea
5 Reasons To See Sister Spit in 2011 (LAist)

Feminist organizations in the United States
Feminist collectives
Lesbian collectives
Lesbian feminism
Culture of San Francisco
American spoken word artists
LGBT organizations in the United States
History of women in California